What Goes Around is Dave Holland's first big band album, released in 2002. Featured players include tenor saxophonist Chris Potter, alto saxophonist Antonio Hart, trumpeters Earl Gardner and Alex Sipiagin, trombonists Robin Eubanks and Josh Roseman, vibraphonist Steve Nelson and drummer Billy Kilson.

Background
The album features his working quintet of the period augmented to big band size with thirteen members. The record won Holland his first Grammy Award as a leader, in the category Best Large Jazz Ensemble Album. The album has seven tracks, all of which, except "Upswing", are re-arrangements of his previously recorded tunes. Richard S. Ginell's review on AllMusic describes these rearrangements as having "more urgency and more tension".

Reception
John Eyles of BBC wrote "...this album is very promising. There are already quite a few milestone albums in Dave Holland's ECM recording career; Conference of the Birds, his stunning debut as a leader, Jumpin In, which introduced his first quintet, and Points of View, the first album from his current quintet, are just the most obvious ones. What Goes Around can be added to that list. In time, it will surely acquire significance as the debut album of Holland's Big Band. It is a solid beginning rather than a sparkling one, but it has many tantalising avenues that cry out to be developed further. As Holland himself has commented about this band, 'Something has been put in motion, and suddenly I see what the next ten years are going to be about.

Track listing
 "Triple Dance" - 9:50
 "Blues for C.M." - 9:02
 "The Razor's Edge" - 6:15
 "What Goes Around" - 17:18
 "Upswing" - 6:51
 "First Snow" - 11:48
 "Shadow Dance" - 14:43

Personnel
 Dave Holland – double bass
 Antonio Hart – alto saxophone, flute
 Mark Gross – alto saxophone
 Chris Potter – tenor saxophone
 Gary Smulyan – baritone saxophone
 Robin Eubanks, Andre Hayward, Josh Roseman – trombone
 Earl Gardner, Alex Sipiagin, Duane Eubanks – trumpet, flugelhorn
 Steve Nelson – vibraphone
 Billy Kilson – drums

References

External links

Dave Holland albums
2002 albums
ECM Records albums
Grammy Award for Best Large Jazz Ensemble Album